Shuteria is a genus of flowering plants in the family Fabaceae. It belongs to the subfamily Faboideae.  Some species of Shuteria are used in traditional medicines.

References

Phaseoleae
Fabaceae genera